The 1999 Segunda División Peruana, the second division of Peruvian football (soccer), was played by 12 teams. The tournament winner, América Cochahuayco was promoted to the Playoff. The tournament was played on a home-and-away round-robin basis.

Results

Standings

Promotion playoff

Notes

External links
RSSSF

Peruvian Segunda División seasons
Peru2
2